Magdalena del Socorro Núñez Monreal (born 13 January 1959) is a Mexican politician affiliated with the Labor Party. She served as Deputy of the LXII Legislature of the Mexican Congress representing Zacatecas until 2015. She is currently the Labor Party's candidate for state governor.

References

1959 births
Living people
Politicians from Zacatecas
Women members of the Chamber of Deputies (Mexico)
Labor Party (Mexico) politicians
21st-century Mexican politicians
21st-century Mexican women politicians
Deputies of the LXII Legislature of Mexico
Members of the Chamber of Deputies (Mexico) for Zacatecas